Grigoris Lambrakis Stadium is a multi-use stadium in Kallithea, Athens, Greece.

It is currently used mostly for football matches and is the home stadium of Athens Kallithea F.C. The stadium was built in 1970 and currently has a seating capacity of 4,200.

Construction of a new stand on the east horseshoe of the Stadium: Capacity of 2,100 seats 

The total cost of the works amounted to € 1,400,000. In the construction of the new stand, special care was given to the accessibility of all areas by the disabled. It also includes new sanitary facilities for spectators, locker rooms for amateur athletes, a canteen and administration offices. Receiving the works, the Mayor of Kallithea, Mr. Costas Askounis, stated: sports in Kallithea. "

Name and nickname
The stadium was named after Grigoris Lambrakis, a Greek politician, physician, and track and field athlete who was assassinated in 1963.

It is commonly referred to by its nickname, El Paso.  The site of the stadium used to be a quarry, evident from the tall rock lining the north end of the stadium.  When the stadium was being built in the 1960s, Clint Eastwood's Spaghetti Westerns were very popular in Greece, and the stadium's nickname is a reference to Eastwood's 1965 film For a Few Dollars More (which had the Greek title Duel in El Paso), as the stadium's backdrop reminded people of images in the movie.

References

External links
 Video of the stadium

Football venues in Greece
Sports venues in Attica
Kallithea
Sports venues completed in 1970
1970 establishments in Greece